Jonathan Corey Crowder (born April 13, 1969) is an American former professional basketball player who played for the Utah Jazz and the San Antonio Spurs of the National Basketball Association (NBA).

A  guard-forward from Kentucky Wesleyan College, Crowder played 58 games in the NBA between 1991 and 1995. He averaged 2.1 points per game for the Utah Jazz and San Antonio Spurs. Crowder later played in Italy, Spain, France and Israel. His son, Jae Crowder, is a player for the Milwaukee Bucks of the NBA.

References

1969 births
Living people
American expatriate basketball people in Canada
American expatriate basketball people in France
American expatriate basketball people in Israel
American expatriate basketball people in Spain
American men's basketball players
ASVEL Basket players
Basketball players from Georgia (U.S. state)
CB Murcia players
Cholet Basket players
Connecticut Pride players
Élan Béarnais players
FC Barcelona Bàsquet players
Florida Beachdogs players
Hapoel Holon players
Kentucky Wesleyan Panthers men's basketball players
La Crosse Bobcats players
Liga ACB players
People from Carrollton, Georgia
Rapid City Thrillers players
San Antonio Spurs players
Scaligera Basket Verona players
Shooting guards
Small forwards
Sportspeople from the Atlanta metropolitan area
Undrafted National Basketball Association players
Utah Jazz players